Nsoko is a town in southern Eswatini about  from the border with South Africa. The town lies on the Ngwavuma river.

This small town was under the governance of one of the Mbokane Chiefs in the pre-1800. In Nsoko, the wet season is hot, muggy, and mostly clear and the dry season is warm and clear. Based on the pool score, the best time of year to visit Nsoko for hot-weather activities is from late February to mid May.

References
Fitzpatrick, M., Blond, B., Pitcher, G., Richmond, S., and Warren, M. (2004)  South Africa, Lesotho and Swaziland. Footscray, VIC: Lonely Planet.

Populated places in Eswatini